Al Verte las Flores Lloran is a 1969 flamenco album by Camarón de la Isla and Paco de Lucía.

Officially, the simple descriptive title for five of the first six collaborative albums by these two performers, including this one, was El Camarón de la Isla con la colaboración especial de Paco de Lucía, but each of the five came to be identified by the title of their first track.

Track listing
 Al verte las flores lloran (Bulerías) 2:40
 Que un toro bravo en su muerte (Tientos) 3:46
 Si acaso muero (Seguiriyas) 4:08 
 En una piedra me acosté (Fandangos) – (José Blas Vega) – 3:26
 Anda y no presumas más (Bulerías por soleá) 3:29
 Camina y dime (Tarantos) 4:51
 Detrás del tuyo se va (Tangos) – (Francisco Almagro / Manuel Villacañas) – 4:20
 Y tú no me respondías (Soleares) 3:58
 Llorando me lo pedía (Fandangos de Huelva) 2:56
 Una estrella chiquitita (Bulerías) 4:17
 Con la varita en la mano (Fandangos) – (José Blas Vega) - 3:31
 Barrio de Santa María (Alegrías) 2:31

Credits 

 Vocals – Camarón De La Isla
 Guitar – Paco De Lucía
 Guitar [Second] – Ramón De Algeciras

1969 albums
Paco de Lucía albums
Camarón de la Isla albums